The 2022 CONCACAF Girls' U-15 Championship was an international football tournament that took take place in Tampa Bay, Florida during July and August 2022.

Teams

Wales are an invitee.

Venues

All matches will take place at the Hillsborough County Tournament Sportsplex in Tampa, Florida.

Group stage

In order to maintain balance and ensure the best development for all youth players, the teams have been divided into two leagues based on their CONCACAF Women's U-17 Rankings and then sub-divided into groups.

Tiebreakers
Greatest number of points obtained in all matches
Goal difference in all group matches
Greatest number of goals in all matches
If 2 or more teams are tied based on above
Greatest number of points scored in matches between the tied teams
Greatest goal difference in matches between the tied teams
Greatest number of goals scored in matches between the tied teams
The lowest number of points based on yellow and red cards in all group matches
First yellow card = +1 point
Second yellow card/indirect red card = +3 points
Direct red card = +4 points
Yellow card and direct red card = +5 points
Drawing of lots by CONCACAF

Source:

League A

Group A

Group B

League B

Group C

Group D

Group E

Knockout stage

League A

Semi-finals

Final

Third-place playoff

Fifth-place playoff

Seventh-place playoff

League B

Semi-finals

Final

Third-place playoff

Fifth-place playoff

Seventh-place playoff

Ninth-place playoff

Eleventh-place playoff

References
Notes

External links
 

2016
Girls' U-15 Championship
2016 in women's association football
International association football competitions hosted by the United States